Terrell, Terell, Terrel, or Terrelle may refer to:

Places

United States
Terrell, Georgia, unincorporated community
Terrell, North Carolina, unincorporated community in Catawba County, North Carolina, United States
Terrell, Texas, city in Kaufman County, Texas, United States
Terrell County (disambiguation), name of two counties in the United States
Terrell Hills, Texas, independent municipality in Bexar County, Texas

Canada
Rural Municipality of Terrell No. 101, Saskatchewan, Canada

People 

A. J. Terrell (born 1998), American football player
Arthur Bishop Terrell (1861–1931), Australian sharebroker
Claude Terrell (born 1982), American football player
Daryl Terrell (born 1975), American football player
Darryl DeAngelo Terrell (born 1991), American photographer, curator
David Terrell (wide receiver) (born 1979), American football player
David Terrell (safety) (born 1975), American football player
David Terrell (fighter) (born 1978), American martial artist
Elah Terrell, American architect
Ernie Terrell (1939–2014), American boxer, singer, and record producer
George Terrell (1862–1952), English politician
Heather Terrell, American writer and lawyer 
James C. Terrell (1806–1835), American politician
Jared Terrell (born 1995), American basketball player in the Israeli Basketball Premier League
Jean Terrell (born 1944), American singer
John Terrell, American para-cyclist
Joseph M. Terrell (1861–1912), American politician
Leo Terrell (born 1955), American lawyer
Mary Church Terrell (1863–1954), American writer and civil rights activist
Pat Terrell (born 1968), American football player
Patsy Terrell (1961–2017), American politician
Paul Terrell, American businessman
Robert Heberton Terrell (1857–1925), African-American justice in Washington, D.C.
Steven Terrell (born 1990), American football player
Suzanne Haik Terrell (born 1954), American lawyer and politician
Tammi Terrell (1945–1970), American singer
Tillotson Terrell (1785–1838), American pioneer
Tracy D. Terrell (1943-1991), American education theorist
Walt Terrell (born 1958), American baseball player
William Terrell (1778–1855), American politician
William Glenn Terrell, Sr. (1877–1964), Florida Supreme Court justice
William Glenn Terrell, Jr. (1920–2013), Washington State University president

First name 
Terrell Bell (born 1973), American basketball player
Terrell Bonds (born 1994), American football player
Terrell Braly (born 1953), American businessman
Terrell Brandon (born 1970), American basketball player
Terrell Buckley (born 1971), American football player
Terrell Burgess (born 1997), American football player
Terrell Ward Bynum (born 1941), American philosopher
Terrell Carver (born 1946), American professor
Terrell Croft (born 1880-1967) American electrical engineer
Terrell Davis (born 1972), American football player
Terrell Edmunds (born 1998), American football player
Terrell Everett (born 1984), American basketball player
Terrell Fletcher (born 1973), American football player
Terrell Forbes (born 1981), English footballer
Terrell Gausha (born 1987), American boxer
 Terrell "Tu" Holloway (born 1989), basketball player for Maccabi Rishon LeZion in the Israeli Basketball Premier League
Terrell Horne (1978-2012), United States Coast Guard, killed in the line of duty
Terrell Hughes (born 1995), professional wrestler
Terrell James (born 1955), American artist
Terrell Lewis (disambiguation), multiple people
Terrell Lowe (born 1998), US association football player
Terrell Lowery (born 1970), American baseball player
Terrell Lyday (born 1979), American basketball player
Terrell Manning (born 1990) American football linebacker
Terrell Maze (born 1984), American football player
Terrell McClain (born 1988), American football defensive tackle
Terrell McIntyre (born 1977), American basketball player
Terrell McSweeny, Commissioner of the Federal Trade Commission
Terrell A. Morgan (born 1957), American linguist
Terrell Myers (born  1974), American basketball player
Terrell Owens (born 1973), American football player
Terrell Peterson (1992-1998), American murder victim
Terrell Ransom Jr., American actor and model
Terrell Roberts (born 1981), American football player
Terrell Sinkfield (born 1990), American football player
Terrell Stafford (born 1966), American jazz trumpeter
Terrell Starr (1925-2009), American politician
Terrell Stoglin (born 1991), American professional basketball player
Terrell Stone, American musician
Terrell Lamont Strayhorn, American academic
Terrell Suggs (born 1982), American football player
Terrell Thomas (born 1985), American football player
Terrell Tilford (born 1969), American actor
Terrell Wade (born 1973), American baseball player
Terrell Watson (born 1993), American football player
Terrell Whitehead (born 1988), American football player
Terrell Wilks (born 1989), American college track and field athlete
Terrell Williams (born 1974), American football player and coach

Middle name
William Terrell Hodges (1934-2022), United States District Court judge

Other 
Terrell rotation, mathematical and physical effect
Terrell County Independent School District, public school district in Sanderson, Texas, United States
Terrell Independent School District, public school district in Terrell, Texas, United States
Terrell on the Law of Patents, a treatise on UK law

Terell
Terell Ondaan (born 1993), Dutch footballer
Terell Parks (born 1991), American basketball player
Terell Stafford (born 1966), American musician
Terell Thomas (born 1995), Association football player

Terrel
 Terrel Bell (1921-1996), United States Secretary of Education
 Terrel Bernard (born 1999), American football player
 Terrel Castle (born 1972), American basketball player
 Terrel E. Clarke (born 1920-1997), American politician
 Terrel Harris (born 1987), American basketball player

Middle name
 Jerrod Terrel Johnson (born 1988), American basketball player

Terrelle
Terrelle Pryor (born 1989), American football player
Terrelle Smith (born 1978), player of American football

See also
 Justice Terrell (disambiguation)
 Tyrrell (disambiguation)
 Terral (surname)